Carlos Aponte Benítez (Tunja, January 24, 1939 – August 1, 2008) was a Colombian footballer. He competed for the Colombia national football team at the 1962 FIFA World Cup which was held in Chile.

Career
Aponte played club football for Santa Fe, Unión Magdalena and Deportes Tolima. In 17 years with Santa Fe, he won three Colombian league titles.

References

1939 births
2008 deaths
Colombian footballers
Colombia international footballers
1962 FIFA World Cup players
Categoría Primera A players
Independiente Santa Fe footballers
Unión Magdalena footballers
Deportes Tolima footballers
Association football defenders